This is a list of geophysicists, people who made notable contributions to geophysics, whether or not geophysics was their primary field. These include historical figures who laid the foundations for the field of geophysics. More recently, some of the top awards for geophysicists are the Vetlesen Prize (intended to be the equivalent of a Nobel Prize for geology or geophysics); the William Bowie Medal (the top award of the American Geophysical Union); the Maurice Ewing Medal (the top award of the Society of Exploration Geophysicists); and the Crafoord Prize for geosciences. Some geophysicists have also won more general prizes such as the Nobel Prize and the Kyoto Prize.

A
 Leason Adams (American, 1887–1969) – high pressure mineral physics
 Thomas J Ahrens (American, 1936–2010) – experimental methods for modeling hypervelocity impacts and materials in the Earth's core and mantle
 Hannes Alfvén (Swedish, 1908–1995) – Alfvén waves, magnetohydrodynamics of magnetosphere; Nobel Prize in Physics
 Giuseppina Aliverti (Italian, 1894–1982), geophysicist remembered for developing the Aliverti-Lovera method of measuring the radioactivity of water
 Keiiti Aki (Japanese-American, 1930–2005) – seismology; William Bowie Medal
 Claude Allègre (French, 1937– ) Crafoord Prize
 Don L. Anderson (American, 1933–2014) – seismology and Earth's interior (including the Preliminary reference Earth model); Crafoord Prize
 Nigel Anstey (British, 1927– ) – exploration geophysicist ; Maurice Ewing Medal (SEG)
 Tanya Atwater (American, 1942– ) – plate tectonic history of North America

B

 George Edward Backus (American, 1930– ) – geophysical mathematician, development of geophysical inverse methods; contributions to dynamo theory
 Milo Backus (American, 1932–2018) – exploration geophysicist; practical 3D exploration; Maurice_Ewing_Medal (SEG)
 Peter Barlow (English, 1776–1862) – experimental and observational studies of terrestrial magnetism, Copley Medal
 Anthony R. Barringer (Canadian/American, 1925–2009) – developed the INPUT airborne electromagnetic system for detecting ores ; Maurice Ewing Medal (SEG)
 Julius Bartels (German, 1899–1964) – contributed to physics of the Sun and Moon; geomagnetism, meteorology and the physics of the ionosphere
 Louis Bauer (American, 1865–1932) – mapped the Earth's magnetic field
 Hugo Benioff (American, 1899–1968) – discovered link between deep earthquakes and subduction zones
 Lloyd Berkner (American, 1905–1967) – studied the ionosphere
 Henry Bryant Bigelow (American, 1879–1967) – awarded the William Bowie Medal
 Francis Birch (American, 1903–1992) – developed theoretical and experimental models for the Earth's interior; Vetlesen Prize
 Kristian Birkeland (Norwegian, 1867–1917) – first realized that energetic electrons cause the aurora; nominated 7 times for Nobel Prize
 Abu Rayhan Biruni (Persian, 973–1048) – made accurate measure of circumference of Earth and other contributions to geodesy
 Jacob Bjerknes (Norwegian-American, 1897–1975) – awarded the William Bowie Medal
 Patrick Blackett (English, 1897–1974) – paleomagnetism, continental drift, Nobel Prize
 Martin Bott (British, 1926–2018) – magnetic anomalies, gravity anomalies
 Pierre Bouguer (French, 1698–1758) – geodesy; the Bouguer gravity anomaly
 William Bowie (American, 1872–1940) – geodesy and isostasy
 Wallace Smith Broecker (American, 1931–2019) – climate, ocean circulation; Crafoord Prize, Vetlesen Prize
 Bernard Brunhes (French, 1867–1910) – paleomagnetism; discovered the first geomagnetic reversal
 Walter Hermann Bucher (German-American, 1888–1965) – awarded the William Bowie Medal
 Edward Bullard (British, 1907–1980) – developed theory of geodynamo, pioneered use of seismology to study the sea floor, and used seafloor bathymetry to test continental drift
 Keith Edward Bullen (New Zealand-born, 1906–1976) – seismological interpretation of the deep structure of the Earth's mantle and core
 Victor Robertovich Bursian (Russian, 1886–1945) – pioneer in theory of Electrical resistivity tomography

C

 Henry Cavendish (British, 1731–1810) – made first estimate of the mass of the Earth
 Anny Cazenave (French, 1944– ) – geodesy and satellite altimetry; awarded William Bowie Medal
 Vlastislav Cervený (Czech) – exploration geophysicist; seismic ray theory; Maurice Ewing Medal (SEG)
 Sydney Chapman (British, 1888–1970) – predicted magnetosphere; developed theories for effect of solar wind on geomagnetic storms and aurorae
 Jule Gregory Charney (American, 1917–1981) – dynamical meteorology; awarded William Bowie Medal
 Jon Claerbout (American, 1937– ) – exploration geophysics seismic data processing and imaging; Maurice Ewing Medal (SEG)
 Alexis Clairaut (French, 1713–1765) – proved Clairaut's theorem and calculated the ellipticity of the Earth
 William Compston (Australian, 1931– ) – developed the Sensitive High Resolution Ion Micro Probe for isotopic analyses of geological samples
 Vincent Courtillot (French, 1948– ) – paleomagnetist; promoted theory that mass extinctions are caused by massive volcanic episodes
 Thomas Cowling (English, 1906–1990) – solar magnetic field, dynamo theory
 Allan V. Cox (American, 1926–1987) – created a timeline for geomagnetic reversals and was a pioneer in plate tectonics; Vetlesen Prize
 Albert P. Crary (American, 1911–1987) – Arctic and Antarctic exploration, seismology

D

 Reginald Aldworth Daly (Canadian, 1871–1957) – awarded the William Bowie Medal
 George Howard Darwin (British, 1845–1912) – analyzed tides and tidal friction; first to develop mathematical theory for evolution of the Sun–Earth–Moon system
 Arthur Louis Day (American, 1869–1960) – mineral physics and volcanology
 Everette Lee DeGolyer (American, 1886–1956) – exploration geophysics in the petroleum industry
 Robert S. Dietz (American, 1914–1995) – proposed (and named) – theory of seafloor spreading; discovered several impact craters including Sudbury Basin
 Hewitt Dix (American, 1905–1987) – exploration geophysics; creator of the Dix equation for reflection velocity, recipient of the Maurice Ewing Medal
 Richard Doell (American, 1923–2008) – created a timeline for geomagnetic reversals and was a pioneer in plate tectonics; Vetlesen Prize
 James Dooge (Irish, 1922–2010) – hydrology
 Erich von Drygalski (German, 1865–1949) – polar explorer and geophysicist
 Adam Dziewonski (Polish/American, 1936–2016) – large-scale structure of Earth's interior and nature of earthquakes; Crafoord Prize

E
 Carl Eckart (American, 1902–1973) – underwater acoustics; awarded William Bowie Medal
 Walter M. Elsasser (American, 1904–1991) – first mathematical dynamo theory for Earth's outer core
 Loránd Eötvös (Hungarian, 1848–1919) – developed a highly accurate torsion balance for gravimetry
 Eratosthenes (Greek, c. 276 BC–195 BC) – measured circumference of the Earth and the tilt of its axis
 Maurice Ewing (American, 1906–1974) – broad contributions to seafloor seismology; predicted and discovered the SOFAR channel

F

 Gerhard Fanselau (German, 1904–1982) – geomagnetic observations
 Joseph Charles Farman (British, 1930–2013) – co-discoverer of the ozone hole
 Yevgeny Konstantinovich Fyodorov (Russian, 1910–1981) – pioneer in Arctic geophysical survey
 Osmond Fisher (British, 1817–1914) – continental drift
 John Adam Fleming (American, 1877–1956) – magnetosphere and atmospheric electricity
 James David Forbes (British, 1809–1868) – built the first seismometer
 Scott Forbush (American, 1904–1984) – solar-terrestrial interactions and the Forbush decrease
 Efi Foufoula-Georgiou (Greek, 1957–) – wavelet analysis
 Gillian Foulger (English, 1952– ) – plate theory
 Robert Were Fox the Younger (British, 1789–1877) – discovered the geothermal gradient; constructed a dip circle for use at sea
 Benjamin Franklin (American, 1706–1790) – established that lightning is electrical

G
 Carl Friedrich Gauss (German, 1777–1855) – first mathematical representation of Earth's magnetic field; geodetic surveys
 Henry Gellibrand (English, 1597–1637) – discovered that magnetic declination varies with time
 James Freeman Gilbert (American, 1931–2014) – development of geophysical inverse theory; network of seismometers to study Earth's free oscillation
 William Gilbert (English, 1544–1603) – early magnetic experiments; first to argue that the Earth itself is magnetic
 George Graham (English 1673 – November 1751) – discovery of the diurnal variation of the Earth's magnetic field; related Aurora borealis to magnetic field variations
 Cecil H. Green (British-born American, 1900–2003) – exploration geophysics geophysical entrepreneur and philanthropist; Maurice Ewing Medal (SEG)
 Harsh Gupta (Indian, 1942– ) – methodology for discriminating normal earthquakes from reservoir-induced ones, study on the genesis of stable continental region earthquakes; Padma Shri, Shanti Swarup Bhatnagar Prize and Waldo E. Smith Award
 Beno Gutenberg (American, 1889–1960) – probability distribution of earthquake energies and relation of energy to magnitude

H

 Edmond Halley (English, 1656–1742) – first chart of Earth's magnetic field
 Christopher Hansteen (Norwegian, 1784–1873) – produced the first charts of the intensity of the Earth's magnetic field
 Harry Hammond Hess (American, 1906–1969) – seafloor gravity anomalies and theory of seafloor spreading
 Georg Hartmann (German, 1489–1564) – kept early records of magnetic declination
 Bernhard Haurwitz (American, 1905– 1986) – meteorology
 Veikko Aleksanteri Heiskanen (Finnish, 1895–1971) – studies of the global geoid
 Raymond Hide (British, 1929–2016) 
 Arthur Holmes (British, 1890–1965) – performed first uranium–lead dating
 M. King Hubbert (American, 1903–1989) – correct statement of Darcy's law and mathematical demonstration that rock undergoes plastic deformation; Vetlesen Prize
 Alexander von Humboldt (German, 1769–1859) – global network of geomagnetic observatories
 Rosemary Hutton (Scottish, 1925–2004) –  geophysicist and pioneer of magnetotellurics

I
 Akitsune Imamura (Japanese, 1870–1948) – seismologist
 Ted Irving (Canadian, 1927–2014) – early paleomagnetic evidence for continental drift
 Ahmet Mete Işıkara (Turkish, 1941–2013) – earthquake scientist

J
 Harold Jeffreys (British, 1891–1989) – deduced that the Earth's outer core is molten; contributed to mathematical geophysics; Vetlesen Prize
 Lucy Jones (American, born 1955) – earthquake science and safety
 Thomas H. Jordan (American, 1948– ) – seismic contributions to plate tectonics
 James A. Jackson (English, 1954– ) – seismologist; contributed to rebuttal of the 'jelly sandwich' model of the crust

K
 Hiroo Kanamori (American, 1936– ) – fundamental contributions to the physics of earthquakes; Kyoto Prize
 Louise H. Kellogg (American, 1959–2019) – modeling of the Earth's mantle
 William Thomson, Lord Kelvin (Irish, 1824–1907) – influential estimate of the age of the Earth, ultimately proved incorrect

L
 Kurt Lambeck (Dutch, 1941– ) – changed understanding of the ways post-glacial rebound affects ocean levels; awarded Wollaston Medal and Balzan Prize
 Johann von Lamont (Scottish, 1805–1879) – surveys of the Earth's magnetic field
 Louis J. Lanzerotti (American, 1938– ) – magnetosphere and ionosphere; awarded William Bowie Medal
 Joseph Larmor (Northern Irish, 1857–1942) – proton precession, dynamo theory
 Inge Lehmann (Danish, 1888–1993) – seismologist who discovered the Lehmann discontinuity and argued for a solid inner core
 Xavier Le Pichon (French, 1937– ) – constructed history of plate motions
 Humphrey Lloyd (Irish, 1800–1881) – observational geomagnetism
 Cinna Lomnitz (Chilean–Mexican, 1925–2016) – creator of "Lomnitz Law", founder of Mexico's first seismic network and editor of Geofísica Internacional
 Andrew Long (Australian, 1965– ) – developed widely used instruments for marine exploration for oil and gas; Honorary Lecturer (Pacific South) for the Society of Exploration Geophysicists
 Augustus Edward Hough Love (English, 1863–1940) – developed theory of Love waves
 Bruce P. Luyendyk (American, 1943– ) – marine geophysics

M

 Gordon J. F. MacDonald (American, 1929–2002) – investigated rotation of the Earth and true polar wander
 James B. Macelwane (American, 1883–1956) – seismologist; awarded William Bowie Medal
 Jean-Jacques d'Ortous de Mairan (French, 1678 –1771) – shape of the Earth and aurora
 Robert Mallet (Irish, 1810–1881) – developed controlled source seismology; coined terms seismology and epicenter
 Syukuro Manabe (Japanese, 1931– ) – climate models; awarded William Bowie Medal
 Pierre de Maricourt (Petrus Peregrinus) (French, fl. 1269) – first extant treatise on properties of magnets; detailed study of the compass
 Edme Mariotte (French, 1620–1684) – one of the pioneers of modern hydrology; used floats to measure river flow
 Drummond Matthews (British, 1931–1997) – used ocean magnetic anomalies to confirm theory of seafloor spreading
 Motonori Matuyama (Japanese, 1884–1958) – first to show that a geomagnetic reversal had occurred in the past
 Dan McKenzie (British, 1942– ) – mathematical framework for plate tectonics; mantle convection; sedimentary basin formation; Crafoord Prize
 Harry Mayne (American, 1913–1990) – exploration geophysicist, invented CRP stacking for noise reduction; Maurice Ewing Medal (SEG)
 Marcia McNutt (American, 1952– ) – elastic strength of lithosphere; identified the South Pacific superswell
 Felix Andries Vening Meinesz (Dutch, 1887–1966) – developed a precise gravimeter and discovered gravity anomalies above the ocean floor
 Oscar Edward Meinzer (American, 1876–1948) – groundwater hydrology; awarded William Bowie Medal
 Henry William Menard (American, 1920–1986) – plate tectonics; awarded William Bowie Medal
 Giuseppe Mercalli (Italian, 1850–1914) – developed Mercalli intensity scale for measuring earthquakes
 John Milne (British, 1849–1913) – invented the horizontal pendulum seismograph
 Andrija Mohorovičić (Croatian, 1857–1936) – identified Mohorovičić discontinuity;
 W. Jason Morgan (American, 1935– ) – geodynamics, plate tectonics
 Jean Morlet (French, 1931–2007) – developed the wavelet transform for exploration geophysics
 Lawrence Morley (Canadian, 1920–2013)) – used ocean magnetic anomalies to confirm theory of seafloor spreading
 Ahsan Mubarak (Pakistani, ?) – seismic detection of nuclear tests
 Walter Munk (American, 1917–2019) – rotation of the earth; acoustic tomography of the oceans; Crafoord Prize, Vetlesen Prize, Kyoto Prize

N
 Louis Néel (French, 1904–2000) – developed theory to explain the stable magnetization in volcanic rocks; Nobel Prize in physics
 Marcia Neugebauer (American, 1932– ) – space physicist and president of the American Geophysical Union
 Marcel Nicolet (Belgian, 1912–1996) – ionosphere; awarded William Bowie Medal
 Robert Norman (English, circa 1550–1600) – re-discovery of magnetic dip
 Amos_Nur (American, 1938– ) – exploration geophysics; rock physics; Maurice Ewing Medal (SEG)

O
 Abel Idowu Olayinka (Nigerian, 1958– ) – applied geophysicist
 Richard Dixon Oldham (British, 1858–1936) – seismologist, first clear evidence for separate arrivals of P-waves, S-waves and surface waves on seismograms; first clear evidence for Earth's core

P

 Luigi Palmieri (Italian, 1807–1896) – seismic studies of Mount Vesuvius
 Eugene Parker (American, 1927–2022) – solar wind and magnetospheres of the Earth and Sun; awarded Kyoto Prize, National Medal of Science, William Bowie Medal
 Antares Parvulescu (American, 1923–1998), inventor of the first time-reversal experiment, and matched equivalent-space signal (MESS) processing.
 Blaise Pascal (French, 1623–1662) – demonstrated that atmospheric pressure decreases with altitude
 Chaim Leib Pekeris (American, 1908–1993) – mathematical methods to study free vibrations of Earth, tides, and origin of Earth's magnetic field; Vetlesen Prize
 William Richard Peltier (Canadian, 1943– ) – geophysical fluid dynamics, glacial rebound, climate change, Vetlesen Prize
 Petrus Peregrinus de Maricourt (French, 13th century) – wrote the first extant treatise describing the properties of magnets and the earliest detailed discussion of freely pivoting compass needles
 Pierre Perrault (1608–1680) – developed the concept of the hydrological cycle
 Alexis Perrey (French, 1807–1882) – seismologist
 Walter C. Pitman, III (American, 1931–2019) – seafloor spreading and tectonics
 George W. Platzman (American, 1920–2008) – geophysical fluid dynamics, numerical weather prediction 
 John Henry Pratt (British, 1809–1871) – laid foundation for principle of isostasy
 Frank Press (American, 1924–2020) – design of a long-period seismograph, and the first detection of the Earth's normal modes of oscillation; Maurice Ewing Medal (SEG)
 Albert Thomas Price (British, 1903–1978) – geomagnetism and global electromagnetic induction

R
 Harry Fielding Reid (American, 1859–1944) – elastic-rebound theory and other contributions to seismology
 Roger Revelle (American, 1909–1991) – global warming and plate tectonics; awarded William Bowie Medal
 Charles Francis Richter (American, 1900–1985) – creation of Richter magnitude scale
 Ted Ringwood (Australian, 1930–1993) – mineral physics; awarded William Bowie Medal and Wollaston Medal
 Enders Robinson (American, 1928– ) – exploration geophysicist; co-inventor of digital seismic signal processing; Maurice Ewing Medal (SEG)
 Ignacio Rodriguez-Iturbe (Venezuelan, 1942– ) – global warming; awarded William Bowie Medal
 Keith Runcorn (British, 1922–1995) – paleomagnetic work supporting continental drift; apparent polar wander

S

 Edward Sabine (Irish, 1788–1883) – measured oblateness of the Earth; established system of magnetic observatories
 Benjamin D. Santer (American, 1955– ) – climatologist
 Conrad Schlumberger (French, 1878–1936) – and Marcel Schlumberger (French, 1884–1953) – invented electric well logging
 Michael Schoenberg (American, 1939–2008) – contributions to seismic anisotropy
 Alessandro Serpieri (Italian, 1823–1885) – seismologist
 Nicholas Shackleton (British, 1937–2006) – paleoceanography, climate, Crafoord Prize, Vetlesen Prize
 Irwin I. Shapiro (American, 1929– ) – awarded William Bowie Medal
 Otto Schmidt (Russian, 1891–1956) 
 Shen Kuo (Chinese, 1031–1095) – discovered magnetic declination
 Robert E. Sheriff (American, 1922 – 2014) exploration geophysics ; Maurice Ewing Medal (SEG)
 John Sherwood (British) – exploration geophysics ; Maurice Ewing Medal (SEG)
 Eugene Merle Shoemaker (American, 1928–1997) – planetary science; awarded William Bowie Medal
 Paul G. Silver (American, 1948–2009) – seismic anisotropy and splitting of shear waves
 Fred Singer (Austrian-American, 1924–2020) – atmospheric physicist, global warming denier
 Susan Solomon (American, 1956– ) – proposed chlorofluorocarbons as the cause of the Antarctic ozone hole; awarded Nobel peace prize and William Bowie Medal
 David J. Stevenson (New Zealander/American, 1948– ) – theories of internal structure and evolution of planets
 Balfour Stewart (Scottish, 1828–1887) – observations of solar flares and geomagnetic storms
 Henry Stommel (American, 1920–1992) – ocean circulation; awarded William Bowie Medal
 David Strangway (Canadian, 1934–2016) – lunar geophysics; university administration ; Maurice Ewing Medal (SEG)
 Carl Størmer (Norwegian, 1874–1957) – motion of charged particles in the magnetosphere and origin of the aurora
 Harald Sverdrup (Norwegian, 1888–1957) – ocean circulation; awarded William Bowie Medal

T

 Albert Tarantola (Spanish, 1949 – 2009) – geophysical inverse problems; Maurice Ewing Medal (SEG)
 Marie Tharp (1920–2006): American geologist and oceanographic cartographer who, in partnership with Bruce Heezen, created the first scientific map of the Atlantic Ocean floor.
 Andrey Nikolayevich Tikhonov (Russian, 1906–1993) – magnetotellurics method in geophysics
 Nafi Toksöz (Turkish-American, 1937– ) exploration geophysics; Maurice Ewing Medal (SEG)
 Sven Treitel (American, 1929– ) – exploration geophysicist; co-inventor of digital seismic signal processing; Maurice Ewing Medal (SEG)
 Merle Tuve (American, 1901–1982) – used radio waves to measure the ionosphere; United States Medal for Merit
 Donald L. Turcotte (American, 1932– ) – developed theory of convection in the Earth's mantle, applications of fractals and chaos to Earth processes; William Bowie Medal of the AGU

V

 James Van Allen (American, 1914–2006) – Van Allen radiation belts; awarded Crafoord Prize, Gold Medal of the Royal Astronomical Society (for geophysics), National Medal of Science, William Bowie Medal
 Petr Vaníček (Czech Canadian, 1935– ) – breakthroughs in theory of spectral analysis and geoid computation, awarded J. Tuzo Wilson Medal, founded Canadian Geophysical Union
 T. Wayland Vaughan (American, 1870–1952) – study of corals and coral reefs, larger foraminifera, and oceanography
 Fred Vine (British, 1939– ) – work on marine magnetic anomalies confirmed the theory of seafloor spreading

W
 Kiyoo Wadati (Japanese, 1902–1995) – researched subduction zone earthquakes; lent name to Wadati–Benioff zone
 Alfred Wegener (German, 1880–1930) – developed theory of continental drift
 Frank T. M. White (Australian, 1909–1971) – mining and metallurgical engineer; mineral science educator
 Emil Johann Wiechert (German, 1861–1928) – first verifiable model of layered structure of the Earth; pioneering work on propagation of seismic waves
 J. Tuzo Wilson (Canadian, 1908–1993) – contributions to plate tectonics: theories of hotspots, transform faults and Wilson cycles; Vetlesen Prize; Maurice Ewing Medal (SEG); President of AGU;
 J. Lamar Worzel (American, 1919–2008) – contributions to underwater acoustics, underwater photography, and gravity measurements at sea
 Carl Wunsch (American, 1941– ) – ocean circulation, climatology; awarded the William Bowie Medal

Z
 Zhang Heng (Chinese, 78–139) – invented the first seismoscope

See also

 List of geodesists
 List of geologists
 List of physicists
 List of presidents of the American Geophysical Union

References

Geophysicists
 
Geodesists
Geophysicists

nl:Lijst van geofysici